Wacław Zygmunt Anczyc (born February 4, 1866 in Warsaw, died September 27, 1938 in Kraków) was a Polish printer and historian, son of Władysław Ludwik Anczyc. He studied history at the Jagiellonian University Faculty of Literature and in Leipzig. After 1883, when his father died, he inherited a printing press in Kraków. In 1900 he moved his printing press to the monastery of the Resurrection. He expanded and modernized the industry, making a large contribution to the development of printing in Poland. In 1908 he founded a compulsory school for students of printing in Kraków.

References

Polish printers
19th-century Polish historians
Polish male non-fiction writers
Writers from Warsaw
1866 births
1938 deaths
Jagiellonian University alumni